"Camelot" is an episode of the British comedy television series The Goodies. Written by The Goodies, with songs and music by Bill Oddie. This episode featured extensive location filming at Bodiam Castle.

Plot
Tim says that he is expecting a letter from his Uncle King Arthur. Bill points out that King Arthur is not Tim's uncle. Tim responds, "Okay, Arthur King", and goes on to point out that his uncle's name is King Arthur on his birth certificate, although admits that there is a comma between "King" and "Arthur". He insisted that the uncle does look "king-ish" and he does live at Camelot, not "Camelot" in Bill's sense, but "Camelot, 33 Acacia Road, Wessex. Graeme and Bill mock Tim about it, and Graeme asks Tim if his aunt is Queen Guinevere. Tim answers "No, of course she's not Queen Guinevere. She's Queen Doris". Tim's other relatives include his Uncle Sir Lancelot, and a parson (the Venerable Bede).

Tim's Uncle King Arthur's heralds signal their arrival by blowing their trumpets, and deliver the letter to Tim by hand. Uncle King Arthur writes that he is having trouble with the local Town Planner and asks Tim to look after "Camelot" while he and the family are on holiday. He says that he will make Tim the Earl of Northumbria if Tim succeeds in keeping "Camelot" out of the Town Planner's hands.

Then, the Town Planner arrives accompanied by two of his clerks (standover men), and asks the Goodies to sign a release for "Camelot" to be handed over to him (following which "Camelot" can be demolished and replaced by a super-highway). Graeme decides that they should fight for "Camelot".

When the Goodies arrive at "Camelot", which is located in an ordinary suburban street, they are surprised to find that "Camelot" is indeed a real castle, complete with drawbridge and moat, bearing an extraordinary resemblance to Bodiam Castle.

Graeme, wandering around the castle, sees some notices on the wall: "An Englishman's castle is his home." and "You don't have to be mad to live here, but it helps", both of which he proceeds to rip off the wall. Bill walks into the room dressed in medieval clothes, while Tim arrives dressed as a jester and immediately begins to tell jester jokes. Tim and Bill say "Once a Knight, always a knight, twice a night, and you're doing all right!" followed by Tim and Bill singing (and dancing) a duet of the Morecambe and Wise song "Bring Me Sunshine".

Graeme is determined to keep "Camelot" safe, and he decides to open the castle to the public to help with its financial upkeep. He sings: "Roll up, roll up to Camelot in 1973, and tour the Middle Ages for only 50p".

The Town Planner then arrives at "Camelot", and Bill signs over the castle to him, saying that Tim's uncle and aunt would like a "two up, two down". Graeme is horrified at what Bill has done and says that Bill should not have sold the castle. Graeme refuses to hand the castle over to the Town Planner, saying that everyone who comes to the castle has to be dressed in medieval clothes. The Town Planner says that he will be back and will take over the castle by vacant possession. Graeme says that they do not intend to leave the castle. However, a fire-breathing dragon and a woman's scream succeed in making the Goodies do so. While they are outside rescuing the 'damsel in distress' from the dragon, the Town Planner returns (dressed as the Black Knight in a suit of medieval armour) to take over the vacant castle, sending the Goodies to the torture chamber to force their consent, but fails.

To regain the castle, the Goodies fight the Town Planner and his clerks in archery, swordsmanship and jousting (with the Goodies riding their trandem instead of a horse). The Goodies and their adversaries also fight other medieval contests, and the Goodies end up winning the battle, so they are able to hold on to the castle for Tim's relatives.

King Arthur and Queen Doris and their family then return from their holiday and everything returns to normal at "Camelot".

DVD and VHS releases

This episode has been released on DVD.

References

 "The Complete Goodies" — Robert Ross, B T Batsford, London, 2000
 "The Goodies Rule OK" — Robert Ross, Carlton Books Ltd, Sydney, 2006
 "From Fringe to Flying Circus — 'Celebrating a Unique Generation of Comedy 1960-1980'" — Roger Wilmut, Eyre Methuen Ltd, 1980
 "The Goodies Episode Summaries" — Brett Allender
 "The Goodies — Fact File" — Matthew K. Sharp

External links
 

The Goodies (series 4) episodes
1973 British television episodes